Ludwig Karl Hermann Schröder (12 September 1884 – 28 July 1941) was a Luftwaffe General who served as the second Military Commander in the Territory of the Military Commander in Serbia.

As the military commander in Serbia,  on 31 May 1941 he ordered the registration of the Jews and Gypsies, who had to be registered and carry a yellow armband as a means identification. This order also contained a ban on the free exercise of professions and exclusion from the public service and private companies. This was followed by the command of the military administration to do forced labor. The Nazi measure to register Jewish assets was also carried out to facilitate the later "aryanization" (de-Jewification). With these orders by Schröder, anti-Jewish persecution measures were standardized in the entire occupied Serbia. Schröder died in the Hohenlychen SS hospital, where he had been transported on 23 July after an airplane accident in Belgrade.

References 

1884 births
1941 deaths
Place of birth missing
Luftwaffe World War II generals
Military personnel from Kiel
Prussian Army personnel
Victims of aviation accidents or incidents in 1941
Luftwaffe personnel killed in World War II
Holocaust perpetrators in Yugoslavia